Nina Canell (born 1979) is a sculpture and installation artist born in Växjö, Sweden and educated at the Dún Laoghaire Institute of Art, Design and Technology in Dublin, Ireland. She currently lives and works in Berlin, Germany

Work 
Nina Canell’s practice concerns the physical and chemical characteristics of materials and found objects as well as their metaphorical and indexical nature.

By placing material forms and immaterial forces into proximity, for example electrifying, heating or moistening wood, copper, plastic or glass, she creates works that embody an interchanging state, a process.  Canell’s sculptural practice concentrates on this transformative affect: materials and objects are either being animated by a process in her installations or have been the site of a process in that an encounter or traversal has taken place. Despite the articulation of the material phenomena, Canell’s works are essentially of indexical nature as they open up a sense for the symbolic capacities of the objects by exploring the relationship between humans, objects and events.  This understanding is formally supported by the works’ minimal installation within the space that devoid of any form of monumentality.

Canell has a preference for working with 'poor' materials, ranging from weathered wooden beams, threads, small branches, melon seeds and nails to wires, electric cables, copper pipes and glass jars.

She frequently collaborates with Robin Watkins.

Solo exhibitions 
Nought to Sixty with Robin Watkins at the Institute of Contemporary Arts London, London, UK, 2009
Nina Canell: To Let Stay Projecting As A Bit Of Branch On A Log By Not Chopping It Off at Museum Moderner Kunst Stifung Ludwig Wien, Vienna, Austria, 12 November 2010 – 30 January 2011
Ode to Outer Ends at Kunsthalle Fridericianum, Kassel, Germany, 2011
Tendrils at the Douglas Hyde Gallery, Dublin, Ireland, 29 September – 4 November 2012
Into the Eyes Ends of Hair at Cubitt Gallery, London, UK, 23 March - 4 May 2012
Lautlos with Rolf Julius at Nationalgalerie im Hamburger Bahnhof – Museum fur Gegenwart, Berlin, Germany, 30 November 2012 – 23 June 2013
Stray Warmings at Midway Contemporary Art, Minneapolis, USA, 15 February – 6 April 2013 
Mid-Sentence at Moderna Museet, Stockholm, Sweden, 27 September 2014 - 6 January 2015
Dolphin Dandelion, Ivry-sur-Seine, France, 21 April – 25 June 2017
Nina Canell at Kunstmuseum St. Gallen, St. Gallen, Switzerland, 25 August – 25 November 2018
Nina Canell: Energy Budget at S.M.A.K., Ghent, Belgium, 23 June – 2 September 2018
Nina Canell: Drag-Out at The David Ireland House, San Francisco, USA, 22 June – 17 August 2019

Collections 
 , Dunkerque, France
 Irish Museum of Modern Art, Dublin, Ireland
Kiasma, Helsinki, Finland
 Moderna Museet, Stockholm, Sweden

References

Further reading

External links 

Canell Watkins

1979 births
Living people
21st-century Swedish women artists
People from Växjö
Swedish women sculptors
Swedish contemporary artists